The 2021 Potchefstroom Open II was a professional tennis tournament played on hard courts. It was the third edition of the tournament which was part of the 2021 ATP Challenger Tour. It took place in Potchefstroom, South Africa between 15 and 21 February 2021.

Singles main-draw entrants

Seeds

 1 Rankings are as of February 8, 2021.

Other entrants
The following players received wildcards into the singles main draw:
  Alec Beckley
  Vaughn Hunter
  Khololwam Montsi

The following players received entry into the singles main draw using protected rankings:
  Jenson Brooksby
  Julien Cagnina

The following player received entry into the singles main draw as an alternate:
  Vít Kopřiva

The following players received entry from the qualifying draw:
  Mirza Bašić
  Jack Draper
  Lucas Miedler
  Ryan Peniston

Champions

Singles

 Jenson Brooksby def.  Teymuraz Gabashvili 2–6, 6–3, 6–0.

Doubles

 Raven Klaasen /  Ruan Roelofse def.  Julien Cagnina /  Zdeněk Kolář 6–4, 6–4.

References

2021 ATP Challenger Tour
2021 in South African tennis
February 2021 sports events in Africa